Pseudonocardia babensis is a bacterium from the genus of Pseudonocardia which has been isolated from a Plant litter from the Ba Bể National Park in Vietnam.

References

Pseudonocardia
Bacteria described in 2010